Indaiatuba is a municipality in the state of São Paulo in Brazil. It is part of the Metropolitan Region of Campinas. The city's name derives from the Tupi language. It is an important city in one of Brazil's main industrial regions.

Based on the latest IFDM social index data, Indaiatuba ranks number one of the "Top 100 best cities to live in, in Brazil".

The Federation of Industries of Rio de Janeiro, surveyed data and compared information on education, health, income and employment (wage and average generation of formal jobs) of all municipalities in the country and, with this data they created the Firjan Development Index Municipal (IFDM), so it was possible to create the rank of the top 100 cities to live in Brazil.

Data was collected from the Ministries of Education, Health and Labour for all municipalities.

References

External links 

 Indaiatuba Official Page 

{}
{}